Jaya Sri, are a Sri Lankan reggae duo consisting of Rohitha Jayalath and Rohan Jayalath, who are twins along with five more members to form full band. Considered one of the most commercially successful music duos in Sri Lanka, Jaya Sri has received global success in many European countries particularly with their literal mixed reggae, hip hop style modern infusion in taking Western and Sinhala music.

Personal life
They were born in Nattandiya, Sri Lanka. Rohitha is three hours older than Rohan. His father Maktildes Jayalath was also a musician. They completed both O/L and A/L education from Maris Stella College, Negombo.

Musical career
When the twins are at montessori age, their grandfather Eusabius Subasinha presented them with two guitars. This has led them to master the different levels of music since very little age. Then they also joined the school band with two Marist brothers. While doing A/Ls, they started to form the band and perform professionally. Then they formed the first band called 'Serendib' which was managed by their father. The band performed in the entire tourist hotel circuit in Negombo area.

After completing education, Rohitha migrated to Austria, Vienna in 1989 to complete his Architectural studies at the University of Fine Arts Vienna. Two years later in 1991, brother Rohan also migrated to Austria and formed the band again. During this period, they were able to perfect their music careers. In 1992–93, the duo signed with Sony Music Europe and made the first ever project CON-DOM with its singles. Finally they entered in European Charts as the first ever Sri Lankans to be in 20 countries selling charts. With this boost, they started to perform with many international bands and toured around the world.

Meanwhile, the duo made many changes with many such music projects including JAYA3, Decadance, Rootsman band, Banditos Bonitos and Global Deejays- Ravers on Dope. Later in 1999, the duo made the musical band 'Jaya Sri'. Meanwhile, Rohitha made a 7-member World Reggae Band which is based in Europe, Vienna and Austria, where the band members are drawn from three continents Asia, Africa, Europe. The band included Aruna Lian (lead guitar) Sumal (drums), Moses (percussion) and Parvesh (keyboards) with Rohitha and Rohan. Later Aruna left the group for personal reasons and replaced by Mathias Kouba and then with Bidu and Herb (lead guitar). In 2003, Jaya Sri were awarded with the Austrian World Music Award and the Austrian Grammy Amadeus for Ravers on Dope (Global Deejays) best dance single. In 2004, they performed in the Vienna City Festival with many international bands on stage including Habib Koité, Bongo Maffin and Tatro Trono. In early June 2004, the band was featured along with the Reggae musician Alpha Blondy and Solar System at the annual Reggae Mountain Festival held in the Alps mountain region Tirol in Austria. This "We Remember Bob Marley Tour' featured other reggae singers such as Exodus, P.A.T. Yardman, Anthony Cox and Inna Valle.

In May 2005, they flew into Paris to perform at the Tsunami Aid Concert organized by the Negombo Association in France to make charity funds for people affected by 2004 Tsunami tragedy in Sri Lanka. In mid 2005, they made concerts at Summer Akadamy Festival in Europe, the Greifenstein Openair and The Asian Night. In late 2005, the band made tours to Italy, Germany, Cyprus, South Korea and Canada and the States in October–November organized by Entertainment Unlimited Toronto, Canada. Along with full band, they returned Sri Lanka three times and performed at Rock Meets Reggae Concert. In 2008, Jayasri concerts were held at Fest der Begegnung' Cultural festival in St. Polten, 'Afrika Festival' in August in Vienna's Danube island where they toured with 'Saamaya-Peace Tour’ Summer Festivals around the Mediterranean.

In the coming years, Jaya Sri made four commercially successful albums with many hits. Meanwhile, they returned Sri Lanka for many musical projects where they composed many theme songs for films and teledramas such as Boodee Keerthisena's film Mille Soya, Pitasakwala Kumarayai Pancho Hathai, Nimnayaka Hudekalawa, Sathya, Rumassala, Oscar nominated Uberto Pasolini's film Machan, Chamara Janaraj Peiris's television serials Piyavi, Raahu. In international arena, they made successful hits with renowned artists and bands such as Ziggy Marley, UB40, Third World, Jimmy Cliff, Inner Circle, Don Carlos, Shaggy, Soft Cell, The Temptations, Alpha Blondy, Falco, La Bouche and Gentleman.

In 2010, the band performed in Europe's biggest festivals and venues such as Reggaejam, Summerjam, Ebreichsdorf Reggae Festival, Afrika Tage - African days, Africult Open Air, Donauinselfest in Austria, Germany and Italy. During these musical shows, they collaboated with the international artists such as The Wailers, Damian Marley, Angélique Kidjo, Marla Glen, Hans Söllner and Eliah Prophet. In the same year, some original songs of Jayasri such as 'Mother Earth' and 'Situkuamriye' were selected for the World Music Compilation CD 'Migrant Music Vienna' which was distributed by Lotus Records Worldwide. In 2016, they released the international music album 'Love' with 15 solo hits. On 27 October 2016, Jaya Sri and Chitral Somapala together with Xotic band performed “Feel Sri Lanka 2016”, the First Single Country Exhibition happening in Maldives. The event took place at Male City Alimas Carnival Stage Open air and on October 28 at Huduranfushi Island Resort.

Apart from music, the duo are engage in many social service programs where they sell T-shirts, caps and jerseys during concerts and the money received is used to help the education of poor children in Sri Lanka.

Discography

Albums

References

External links
 Jaya Sri Discography

Reggae duos
Sri Lankan musical groups
Twin musical duos
Universal Music Group artists